Michael Paul Ansah (born 31 October 1928) was a Ghanaian politician who served in the First and Third Republics. He served as a member of parliament for the Akwamu constituency from 1965 to 1966 and the member of parliament for the Mid-Volta constituency from 1979 to 1981. He also served as the Minister for Health from 1979 to 1981 and the Minister for Industry, Science and Technology from August 1981 to December 1981.

Early life and education
Ansah was born on 31 October 1928 in Anum, a town in the Eastern Region. He had his early education at the Mampong-Akwapim Primary School from 1935 to 1940. He had his middle school education at the Akropong-Akwapim Middle School and the Begoro Middle School from 1941 to 1942 and from 1942 to 1944 respectively. He entered the Presbyterian Secondary School (now Presbyterian Boys' Senior High School) in 1945 completing in 1949. He later had his post-secondary education at the Akropong Teacher Training College (now the  Presbyterian College of Education, Akropong) where he obtained his Teachers' Certificate 'A'. After a few years in the teaching profession he entered the University of Ghana, Legon graduating with a degree in history in 1959. He later read politics and anthropology at the Institute of African Studies at the University of Ghana graduating in 1965. He was the first president and founder of the Students Historical Association at the University of Ghana he was also the founder and first secretary of the Akwamu Youth League in 1958 (now Akwamu Students Union).

Career
Ansah begun teaching at the Presbyterian Secondary School at Odumase Krobo until he was transferred to the Institute of Arts and Culture on 30 June 1962. In 1965, he was appointed headmaster of O'Reilly Secondary School.

Politics
In June 1965 Ansah was elected as member parliament for the Akwamu Constituency under the Convention Peoples Party regime. He served in this capacity until February 1966 when the Nkrumah government was overthrown.

On 24 September 1979 when the third republic was ushered in, he entered parliament representing the Mid-Volta constituency on the ticket of the People's National Party where he was elected as Majority Leader and Leader of the House. That same year, he was appointed a Cabinet Minister under the Minister for Health and he remained in that post until he was moved to the Ministry for Industry, Science and Technology in 1981. He served in that capacity until the Limann government was ousted by the Armed Forces Revolutionary Council on 31 December 1981.

Personal life
His hobbies included gardening, playing lawn tennis and listening to music. He was married to Mrs Dora Ansah (née Arjarquah), with whom he had 6 children.

See also
 Minister for Health
 List of MPs elected in the 1965 Ghanaian parliamentary election
 List of MPs elected in the 1979 Ghanaian parliamentary election

References

1928 births
Possibly living people
Ghanaian MPs 1965–1966
Ghanaian MPs 1979–1981
Convention People's Party (Ghana) politicians
National Convention Party (Ghana) politicians
20th-century Ghanaian politicians
Presbyterian Boys' Senior High School alumni
Presbyterian College of Education, Akropong alumni
University of Ghana alumni
Akan people